Robin Ramsay  is an Australian former television, film and stage actor. He appeared in the rural series Bellbird as Charlie Cousins, in which he was best known for the scene where he falls from a wheat silo and dies.

Early life and education

Ramsay is the grandson of William Ramsay, the founder and manufacturer of the shoe polish firm Kiwi,

Ramsay is the disowned son of Thomas Meek Ramsay and Alice née James (1909-2009).  His parents divorced, and his mother later married her long-time paramour, the architect Roy Grounds.

Ramsay studied at London's Royal Academy of Dramatic Art, graduating in 1957. He worked briefly for the BBC then returned to Australia.

Career

Theatre
After returning to Australia, Ramsay joined the fledgling Union Theatre Company in Melbourne, whose members included Zoe Caldwell and Barry Humphries. He starred in Moon on a Rainbow Shawl, produced for the first Adelaide Festival in 1960.

He has played roles in theatre locally starting from 1957 and then went to the United States in 1961 and joined the Theatre Company of Boston. He then toured the country in The National Repertory Theatre, with Eva Le Gallienne and Faye Emerson.

In 1964 he took the role of Fagin in the hit musical Oliver! on Broadway, a role he played for a further two years in New York, followed by a record-breaking national tour. He shared the bill with the Beatles, singing a song from the musical in a subsequently memorable edition of The Ed Sullivan Show. In 1966 Ramsay recreated his role of Fagin for a West End revival of Oliver!, with Marti Webb as Nancy.

Television
Returning to Australia, Ramsay's role as Charlie Cousens, the dodgy real estate agent in Bellbird, Australia's first successful television soap opera, garnered him considerable public notice. A regular character on the show from August 1967, Ramsay decided to leave in May 1968 to take the role of Fagin in a Japanese stage production of Oliver!.

When the show's producers decided to kill off his character, with Cousens falling off a wheat silo, staging what has been described as "one of the most-watched and best-remembered moments in Australian TV history", fans wrote letters protesting his death and even sent flowers to his funeral.

Return to stage
Ramsay returned to the theatre playing the controversial priest Daniel Berrigan in the Trial of the Catonsville Nine in Sydney. He went on to play Pontius Pilate in 's original production of Jesus Christ Superstar. He was in the first production at the opening of the Sydney Opera House in 1972: playing MacHeath in The Threepenny Opera. Polly Peachum was played by Pamela Stephenson. Ramsay spent the next few years as a leading actor with the Sydney Theatre Company the Melbourne Theatre Company, and working in film and television. He has twice won the Melbourne Critics Circle Award for Best Actor. He was in Medea the opening production of the Melbourne Arts Centre, playing opposite Zoe Caldwell.

In 1977, with Rodney Fisher, he developed his first solo show, drawn from the writings of Henry Lawson, The Bastard From The Bush. This refocusing on Lawson as a sophisticated short-story writer and diarist, rather than as a 'bush poet', radically altered Australia's view of their favourite icon. The play toured to Riverside Studios in London, and played extended seasons at Sydney's Belvoir Street Theatre and the Victorian Arts Centre. The production won the Australian Arts Award

In the early 1980s Ramsay was commissioned to create a new solo show celebrating the life and times of Rabindranath Tagore, India's Nobel Prize-winning poet: titled Borderland. The invitation came from the Indian High Commission in Canberra. The play was performed in Australia, then toured to more than 60 countries, in tandem with The Bastard From The Bush. The tour was sponsored by the Australian Government, the British Council and the Indian Government.

Ramsay then formed his own chamber theatre company, "Open Secret", and continued touring internationally, developing new productions, notably Vikram Seth's Beastly Tales from Here and There  and incorporating local musicians into the company's presentations. His new solo play The Accidental Mystic, high times on the Indian ashram trail, written by his wife Barbara Bossert, opened at Melbourne's Malthouse Theatre in 1995, after seasons in Sydney and the Edinburgh Festival. The play toured to London and throughout India. Ramsay was nominated for a Melbourne Critics Circle Best Actor Award for his performance.
 
In 1994 he played Julie Christie's husband, Wilf Barlow, in the miniseries Dada is Death, and toured to the Tokyo International Theatre Festival with the Playbox Theatre.

Producing  and directing
In 2008 he produced and directed the feature film Tao of the Traveller, a spiritual adventure film which won a Best Film Award at the South African International Film Festival in 2008, and was selected for screening at several festivals in 2009, including the British Film Festival in Los Angeles, Egypt International Film Festival, Thailand International Film Festival, and Swansea Bay International Film Festival. In 2008 the film was also invited to the Fallbrook Film Festival in California, and won awards in the Research and Experimental categories at the Accolade Film Festival.

Ramsay became interested in Eastern spiritual matters in the 1960s and studied Taoism and Buddhism and many of the mystical poets such as Rumi, Tagore and Hafiz. During the 1980s, he came across the teachings of Brother Lekhraj Kripalani, now formalised as the Brahma Kumaris World Spiritual University, while still performing with Open Secret. From 2003 to 2006 he was coordinator of a Brahma Kumaris retreat centre near Wilton New South Wales. Ramsay was invited to recreate his Tagore show Borderland in London, for the Lord Mayor of London's "India Now" celebrations.

In 2008 Ramsay was asked by BK management to make a film on the history of the Brahma Kumaris. After research in the British and New York public libraries, it became apparent that the group's history had been seriously compromised in its statements and publications. Ramsay's subsequent film on the group, drawn from original BKWSU sources, after its initial popular screening to adherents, was banned from being screened to stakeholders by BK management. BK management held a poll among those who had attended the screening, claiming the audience had strongly disapproved of the film. This turned out to be false, and management apologised.

Curator
Since 2009 Ramsay has been a curator of the forest retreat 'Sanctuary Australia' in northern NSW. The retreat is run on Brahma Kumaris principles, while embracing a cruelty-free diet and lifestyle.

Personal life
Ramsay is father of Robina Ramsay, an internationally ranked dressage rider, and anthropologist Tamasin Ramsay.

Select filmography
Love and War TV miniseries. (1967)
Bellbird TV series. (1967–1968) 
Jesus Christ Superstar TV. (1972)
The Box (1975)
Shannon's Mob TV series. (1975) 
Mad Dog Morgan (1976)
Oz (1976)
Bedfellows (1980)
Conferenceville (1984)  
A Street to Die (1985)
Return to Eden TV series. (1986)
Dear Cardholder (1987) 
Dadah Is Death (1988)
Embassy TV series. (1990)
The Damnation of Harvey McHugh TV series. (1994)
Mercury TV series. (1996)

References

External links

Bellbird (1967–1977) Aussie Soap Archive. Accessed 27 July 2007

1939 births
Brahma Kumaris
Living people
Australian male television actors
People educated at Geelong Grammar School
Alumni of RADA